Julio Pablo Rosas Huaranga (born 9 April 1958) is a Peruvian pastor and politician who is a former Congressman, representing Lima from 2011 to 2019. His term was cut short by the dissolution of the Congress of Martín Vizcarra in 2019. He was originally a member of the Popular Force, but later he switched to the Alliance for Progress, but he later left and joined the Republican Action parliamentary group.

Biography 
Rosas was born in the district of Santa María del Valle, in the department of Huánuco, on September 4, 1958. He completed his primary and secondary studies in the city of Huánuco. Between 1977 and 1979 he studied pastoral ministry at the Alianza de Huánuco Theological Institute, dedicating himself to the exercise of his ministry. In 1991 he started the Christian and Missionary Alliance Church in the district of San Martín de Porres in the province of Lima.

Political career

Congressman 
In the 2011 elections, he ran for a seat in Congress under the Fujimorist Force 2011 party of Keiko Fujimori, representing the constituency of Lima and was elected for the 2011–2016 term. Five years later, in the 2016 elections, he ran for re-election, this time under the Alliance for the Progress of Peru coalition and was narrowly re-elected for the 2016–2021 term, defeating Congressman Luis Iberico by a margin of 35 votes. he left the Alliance for Progress bench in Congress in 2017 and joined the Republican Action parliamentary group in 2019. However, his term was cut short by the dissolution of the Congress of Martín Vizcarra in 2019. Since its inception in 2011, it has presented 10 bills of which only 4 served as the basis for an approved law. On the contrary, it participated with adherent in more than 100 projects of laws. However, his most notorious political activity was given with the support of the movement With my children you do not get involved, opposed to the gender approach in education and whose spokesman was precisely Christian Rojas, son of the congressman.

References 

Peruvian evangelicals
1958 births
Living people
Fujimorista politicians
Members of the Congress of the Republic of Peru

Alliance for Progress (Peru) politicians
People from Huánuco Region